Perry Mutapa (born 18 November 1979 in Lusaka) is a Zambian football midfielder.

He was part of the Zambian 2000 African Nations Cup team, who finished third in group C in the first round of competition, thus failing to secure qualification for the quarter-finals. He also took part at the 1999 FIFA World Youth Championship.

Clubs
1997-1999:  Zanaco FC
1999-2000:  SC Farense
2003-2004:  Nkwazi FC
2004–2006:  Orlando Pirates FC
2006–2008:  FC AK

References

External links

1979 births
Living people
Sportspeople from Lusaka
Zambian footballers
Zambia international footballers
2000 African Cup of Nations players
Zambian expatriate footballers
S.C. Farense players
Orlando Pirates F.C. players
Primeira Liga players
Expatriate footballers in Portugal
Expatriate soccer players in South Africa
Zanaco F.C. players
F.C. AK players

Association football midfielders